Bruna Castagna (Bari, October 15, 1905 – Pinamar, July 10, 1983) was an Italian mezzo-soprano.

Biography 
Castagna was the daughter of Luigi and Maria Catacchio, and studied piano in Milan prior to turning to singing as a career. She debuted at the Teatro Communale in Mantua in 1925, singing the role of Marina Mniszech in Boris Godunov by Modest Mussorgsky. That same year she began appearing at the Teatro Colón in Buenos Aires, singing such roles as Zita in Gianni Schicchi, Bersi in Andrea Chénier, the shepherd in Tosca, Anciana in L'amore dei tre re, and Amelfa in The Golden Cockerel. 1925 also saw her bow at the Teatro alla Scala in Milan. There she would go on to perform a variety of roles, both major and minor; she would also take part in the world premiere of Il Dibuk of Lodovico Rocca in 1934. In 1934 Castagna moved to the United States, soon becoming known for her performances in the Italian and French repertoire. Among the roles which she took on during this time were Amneris in Aida, Azucena in Il trovatore, Adalgisa in Norma, Laura in La Gioconda, Ulrica in Un ballo in maschera, Leonora in La favorita, Carmen, and Delilah in Samson et Dalila. She appeared at the Metropolitan Opera and at the San Francisco Opera, and sang as well in Latin America. Castagna retired in 1945 and settled permanently in Argentina.

Discography 
 Verdi – Aida – Cigna, Martinelli, Castagna, Morelli, Moscona – Dir. Panizza – Metropolitan, live 1937 ed. Myto
 Bellini – Norma – Cigna, Martinelli, Castagna, Pinza – Dir. Panizza – Metropolitan, live 1937 ed. GOP
 Verdi – Messa di requiem – Milanov, Kullman, Castagna, Moscona – Dir. Toscanini – New York, live 1938 ed. Archipel
 Ponchielli – La Gioconda – Milanov, Martinelli, Morelli, Castagna, Moscona – Dir. Panizza – Metropolitan, live 1939 ed. Myto
 Rossini – Petite Messe Solennelle – Ginster, Kullman, Castagna, Warren – Dir. Barbirolli – Carnegie Hall, live 1939 ed. Guild
 Verdi – Aida – Milanov, Gigli, Castagna, Tagliabue – Dir. Panizza – Metropolitan, live 1939 ed. EJS/Lyric Distribution
 Verdi – Messa di requiem – Milanov, Castagna, Bjorling, Moscona – Dir. Toscanini – Carnegie Hall, live 1940  ed. Melodram
 Verdi – Un ballo in maschera – Bjorling, Milanov, Castagna, Svèd, Andreva – Dir. Panizza – Metropolitan, live 1940 ed. Arkadia/Myto/GOP
 Verdi – Aida – Martinelli, Roman, Castagna, Warren, Pinza – Dir. Panizza – Metropolitan, live 1941 ed. Cantus Classics
 Verdi – Il trovatore – Bjorling, Greco, Castagna, Valentino, Moscona – Dir. Calusio – Metropolitan, live 1941 ed. Cetra/Arkadia
 Verdi – Un ballo in maschera – Martinelli, Roman, Bonelli, Castagna – Dir. Panizza – Metropolitan, live 1942 ed. EJS/Eklipse
 Verdi – Rigoletto – Weede, Reggiani, Landi, Moscona – Dir. Panizza – Metropolitan live 1942 ed. Bongiovanni  
 Verdi – Aida – Milanov, Castagna, Martinelli, Bonelli, Cordon – Dir. Pelletier –  Metropolitan, live 1943 ed. Cetra/GOP/Cantus Classics
 Ponchielli – La Gioconda – Roman, Jagel, Warren, Castagna, Moscona – Dir. Cooper – Metropolitan, live 1945 ed. Gala
 Verdi – Il trovatore – Baum, Milanov, Warren, Castagna, Moscona – Dir. Sodero – Metropolitan, live 1945 ed. Walhall

References 

 AA.VV. – Grande Enciclopedia della Musica Lirica – Vallecchi & C. Periodici

Italian operatic mezzo-sopranos
1905 births
1983 deaths
20th-century Italian women opera singers
People from Bari
Italian emigrants to Argentina